Podkriváň is a village and municipality in Detva District, in the Banská Bystrica Region of central Slovakia.

References

External links
 
 
https://web.archive.org/web/20160803191026/http://podkrivan.e-obce.sk/

Villages and municipalities in Detva District